Ben Swanson (London) is an English first-class cricketer.

Swanson was born at London. He later studied at St Peter's College at the University of Oxford. While studying at Oxford, he made two appearances in first-class cricket for Oxford University against Cambridge University in The University Matches of 2017 and 2019. Swanson took a single wicket in each of the matches with his slow left-arm orthodox bowling, that of Nipuna Senaratne.

References

External links

1998 births
Living people
People from London
Alumni of St Peter's College, Oxford
English cricketers
Oxford University cricketers